ESPN Radio 1600 could refer to:

 WPDC, a radio station serving the Harrisburg, PA market
 KGYM, a radio station serving the Cedar Rapids, IA market
 KEPN, a radio station serving the Denver, CO market